Nova Campina is a municipality in the state of São Paulo in Brazil. The population is 9,860 (2020 est.) in an area of 385 km². The elevation is 848 m.

References

Municipalities in São Paulo (state)